Thierry Jean-Andre Coup is the current senior vice president, chief creative officer of Universal Creative, Universal Destinations & Experiences' research and development division. Coup began his career working in the film industry, performing set design and visual effects. He moved into theme park design in the early 1990s when Walt Disney Parks and Resorts offered him a position with Walt Disney Imagineering. In the late 1990s, he transferred over to Universal Creative and worked on projects such as The Amazing Adventures of Spider-Man, Harry Potter and the Forbidden Journey, Transformers: The Ride and The Wizarding World of Harry Potter - Diagon Alley.

Career
Coup began his career working in the film and television industry. He provided set design, visual effects, and stop-motion animation for a variety of films and TV commercials. Coup is credited for working on Back to the Future, Flight of the Navigator, Total Recall, Dick Tracy, and Gremlins 2: The New Batch.

Walt Disney Parks and Resorts' research and development division, Walt Disney Imagineering, noticed Coup's work and subsequently offered him a job in the early 1990s. Although he wasn't looking to leave the film and television industry, Coup was intrigued by the challenges the new job would entail and accepted the position. Coup's first task with Disney was to redesign Tomorrowland at Disneyland. He then worked alongside others on the design of Discoveryland at Disneyland Paris, where Coup's particular focus was on Space Mountain: De la Terre à la Lune. Coup's final two projects for Disney were for Walt Disney Studios Park: Armageddon – Les Effets Speciaux and Moteurs... Action! Stunt Show Spectacular (the latter was duplicated for Disney's Hollywood Studios several years later).

In the late 1990s, Coup returned to the United States and began working for Universal Creative. Most of the division's focus at that time was on the development of Islands of Adventure in Orlando, Florida. Coup was tasked as the creative director for Marvel Super Hero Island. The flagship ride for the area was The Amazing Adventures of Spider-Man, a prototype dark ride which combined 3D imagery with a track-mounted motion simulator. Coup was both the Production Designer and film producer for the ride, and holds a patent for part of the ride's technology. The ride was later cloned for Universal Studios Japan.

After Islands of Adventure launched in 1999, Coup worked on developing 4D films for Universal parks across the globe. In the United States, Shrek 4-D was launched, while in Japan, Sesame Street 4-D Movie Magic was launched. The two films have since been shown at parks owned by SeaWorld Entertainment, Village Roadshow Theme Parks, and Parques Reunidos. Work on the Revenge of the Mummy enclosed roller coasters, and a refurbishment of Universal Studios Hollywood's Studio Tour, followed.

Coup's next major project was to be the creative director for The Wizarding World of Harry Potter at Islands of Adventure. Coup and other employees of Universal Creative made several trips to Scotland to meet with J.K. Rowling, the author of the Harry Potter series of books. The headline attraction for the area was Harry Potter and the Forbidden Journey, an attraction Coup served as both creative director and film director on. The overall themed area was a success with attendance increasing by 36% following the launch. Clones followed at Universal Studios Hollywood and Universal Studios Japan.

In January 2011, Coup was promoted to the role of Senior Vice President for Universal Creative. The role would see him lead "creative development activities for upcoming attractions off all Universal theme parks world-wide". In the new role he was the creative director for Transformers: The Ride and has overseen the development of Despicable Me: Minion Mayhem. In 2013, Coup's focus was on the expansion of The Wizarding World of Harry Potter at Islands of Adventure into the adjacent Universal Studios Florida park with Diagon Alley.

Led by Thierry Coup, the introduction of The Wizarding Worlds has been transformational for Universal Orlando Resort and Universal Studios Japan. More recently, it has contributed to a significant attendance boost at Universal Studios Hollywood. These immersive lands have become an industry reference point for the use of theming, intellectual property and theme park design.

With over two decades with Universal, Coup brings innovation, insight and creative flair, and has been recently celebrated as one of the top theme park influencers on The 2018 Blooloop 50 Theme Park Influencers List. Blooloop celebrates this list as key individuals who helped shape the multi-billion global industry, leaving their mark on the 21st century theme park experience.

Projects

Notes

References

External links
 
 
 
 

Living people
Place of birth missing (living people)
Universal Parks & Resorts
Disney imagineers
Year of birth missing (living people)